Monotheist is the fifth and final studio album by the Swiss extreme metal band Celtic Frost. The album was released in May 2006 and was the first new recording released by the band in 16 years. Upon its release, the album was met with critical acclaim.

Development
Preparation and development work for the project had been ongoing since 2000. The first recording sessions for the album started in late October 2002. The band consisted of founding members Martin Eric Ain (bass/vocals) and Tom Gabriel Fischer (voice/guitars/keyboards), along with guitarist/producer Erol Unala, Fischer's long-time songwriting partner. Unala became an increasingly significant part of Celtic Frost during the songwriting. Working titles for the album included Probe and Dark Matter Manifest.

"Obscured" comes from the demo track "November" from the 2002 demo album "Prototype".

"Drown in Ashes" uses lyrics from the demo track "The Dying I".

Music
Celtic Frost's earlier work melded elements of thrash metal and black metal. The sound of Monotheist has been described as difficult to reduce to specifics, as the songs vary from doom metal to "blackened thrash" to gothic metal to symphonic metal. The result is a wide-ranging but very dark heavy metal experience. Don Kaye of Blabbermouth called it "a monstrously heavy and oppressive slab of metal" which goes "into even heavier, blacker territory" than previous albums. Adrien Begrand of PopMatters said that the album was nearly a masterpiece of "brutally heavy" metal, "completely devoid of light". Eduardo Rivadavia of AllMusic noted more subtle touches such as the "instantaneously infectious melody" of "A Dying God Coming into Human Flesh", and the "haunting female voices" heard in duet with bandleader Tom Warrior on "Drown in Ashes".

According to Fischer, some of the lyrics were influenced by the writings of the English occultist Aleister Crowley. This influence manifests itself in tracks such as "Os Abysmi Vel Daath", which is the partial name of one of Crowley's books.

Release
Monotheist was released on CD and LP. A limited edition digipak featured the bonus track "Temple of Depression". Both the vinyl LP version and the Japanese CD release of Monotheist feature the bonus track "Incantation Against You".

A video was made for the song "A Dying God Coming into Human Flesh".

The album was ranked number 2 on Terrorizers list of the best albums of the decade.

Track listing

Credits
 Thomas Gabriel Fischer – vocals, guitars, arrangements, programming
 Martin Eric Ain – bass, vocals (most vocals on "A Dying God Coming into Human Flesh", all vocals on "Triptych I: Totengott", and spoken parts on "Triptych II: Synagoga Satanae"), and executive producer of album
 Erol Unala – guitars, engineer, additional programming on "Temple of Depression"
 Franco Sesa – drums

Session musicians
 Lisa Middelhauve (Xandria): guest vocals on "Drown in Ashes"
 Ravn (1349): backing vocals in final chorus of "Temple of Depression"
 Simone Vollenweider: guest backing vocals on "Temple of Depression", additional vocals on "Obscured", and lead vocals on "Incantation Against You"
 Sigurd Wongraven (Satyricon): brief segment of lead vocals on "Triptych II: Synagoga Satanae"
 Peter Tägtgren: backing vocals on "Triptych II: Synagoga Satanae" and co-producer of album
 Walter J.W. Schmid: engineering, mixing, mastering
 Phillip Schweidler: engineering, mixing

Charts

References

External links
"The Great Beast Resurrected" – article in PopMatters covering the band's comeback and an early review of the album

Celtic Frost albums
2006 albums
Century Media Records albums
Albums produced by Peter Tägtgren